St. Mark's College is a theological college affiliated to the University of British Columbia. It was founded in 1956 by the Congregation of St. Basil for graduate studies and undergraduate studies at Corpus Christi College founded in 1999 as a liberal arts college. As of August 2022, Dr. Gerry Turcotte is the president of Corpus Christi College and is the principal of St. Mark's College and the community. The college is situated on the University Endowment Lands on West Point Grey on the UBC Campus.  The college hosts the local parish church, St. Mark's Church.

History
In 1956, St Marks College was founded by the Congregation of St. Basil when it received its charter from the Parliament of British Columbia. The Basilian Fathers also founded the University of St. Michael's College in the University of Toronto and Assumption University in Windsor, Ontario. When St. Mark's was founded it was immediately affiliated with the University of British Columbia. Since the college was next to UBC, Corpus Christi College was formed in 1999 in the Jesuit tradition for higher education. Corpus Christi-St. Mark’s is on the traditional, ancestral, and unceded territory of the Musqueam People.  The community is thankful to be able to live, work, play, and create on the traditional ancestral unceded territory of the Coast Salish peoples, including the xʷməθkwəy̓əm (Musqueam), Skwxwú7mesh (Squamish), and Səl̓ílwətaʔ/Selilwitulh (Tsleil-Waututh) Nations.
 

The college hosts St. Mark's Church on its grounds where the parish uses the auditorium and chapel for services.  The parish serves as a ministry to the community and neighbourhood the university.

While the Basilian Fathers supported the college, Fr. Jim Hanrahan CSB (the longest-serving principal of the college) taught in the University of British Columbia Department of History.  On the St. Mark's campus, the south wing is named Hanrahan Hall after him.

In 1998, construction of St. Mark’s College was completed and hosted the local Catholic parish St Ignatius. The registrar of the college, Fr. Klosterman CSB also served as parish priest.

In 2005, the Basilian fathers transitioned away from the college and parish. That year, the college appointed its first lay Principal, Dr. David Sylvester.

On 15 October 2013, the principal of St. Mark's College, Mark Hagemoen was appointed as the bishop of the Diocese of Mackenzie-Fort Smith. On 16 June 2014, Dr Peter M. Meehan was appointed as the new principal of St. Mark's College and the President of Corpus Christi.  Michael William Higgins became the interim president and principal in June 2020.  Dr. Gerry Turcotte in August of 2022 now serves as the current principal of St. Mark's College and president of Corpus Christi College.

Facilities

Campus
The college is located in the northeast of the university's Vancouver campus. The buildings include the Dr. John Micallef Memorial Library, various classrooms, student lounges and study spaces, a cafe, and the college chapel, as well as administrative areas for student advisors and faculty members.

Academic programs
The college, through its charter, is able to offer Bachelors, Masters and Doctoral degree in theology. The College currently offers Masters and Masters of Arts in Theological Studies, Educational Leadership, Pastoral Studies, Religious Education. A diploma is available for each program.

As well, it is in charge of the academic formation for the first permanent diaconate program in the Archdiocese of Vancouver. 
Each year at its graduation ceremony, the College also grants an honorary doctorate.

The undergraduate program through Corpus Christi College is a 2-year liberal arts transfer program and offers and Associate of Arts degree.

Library
The Dr. John Micallef Memorial Library not only serves the college but is shared with Corpus Christi College. It is a member of the Vancouver School of Theology. It shares online resources with Regent College, Vancouver College, and the Carey Theological College.

Notable faculty
 Father David Bauer  (1924–1988), Basilian priest, founder of the Canada men's national ice hockey team and inductee into the Hockey Hall of Fame

See also
 St. Mark's Chapel, Vancouver
 Corpus Christi College

References

External links
 St. Mark's College site
 St. Mark's Parish site

Universities and colleges in Vancouver
Colleges in British Columbia
University Endowment Lands
Catholic universities and colleges in Canada